Rico Hoye (born November 9, 1974) is an American professional boxer who current competes in the Cruiserweight division.  He resides Phoenix, Arizona, and is a former number one ranked light heavyweight contender (IBF) and a former world title challenger in the light heavyweight division. Hoye was a Cruiserweight division contestant in the fourth season of the Contender, boxing three 5-round bouts and one 8-round bout on Versus, winning three.

Early life and professional career
Hoye was raised in Monroe, Michigan and Detroit, Michigan. His father, Bobby Hoye (1951–1996) was a professional super middleweight contender. Rico was raised by his grandfather Robert Hoye (1930–1999) a United States Army and Golden Gloves middleweight boxer.
Both his father and grandfather brought him to the gym as an infant and he first competed at 7 years old. As a teenager, he was trained by his grandfather, and he was able to amass a 68-12 amateur record, including junior Olympic titles and Golden Gloves titles in Toledo and Detroit, and was hopeful for an opportunity to make the 1992 Olympic team. At that time, however, his grandfather was injured and wasn't able to train him and he strayed from the sport and became involved in street activity around his Detroit neighborhood. In a 1992 altercation at 17 years old, he shot and killed someone and spent 9 years in prison. While in prison, both his father and grandfather died. Upon his release from prison, he immediately began seriously training and was soon back in the ring competing.

Hoye made his professional debut in June 2001 with a third round stoppage of Omar Pucci in Michigan.  Over the next two years, Hoye scored twelve consecutive wins.  He won the vacant IBA Continental Light Heavyweight title by decisioning Prince Badi Ajamu over 12 rounds in June 2003.

Defenses and challenges
Hoye made three defenses of his IBA regional title. He defeated Etienne Whitaker in October 2003, Donnell Wiggins in March 2004, and Montell Griffin in September 2004 in a bout which was also an International Boxing Federation eliminator for a world title shot.

In March 2005, the 18-0 Hoye traveled to England to challenge Clinton Woods for the vacant IBF title, losing on a fifth-round technical knockout. In May 2007, Hoye challenged unbeaten Romanian boxer Adrian Diaconu for the WBC International light heavyweight title, an eliminator for the full WBC world title, and lost when the fight was stopped in the 3rd round.

Contender
In late 2008, Hoye moved up to the cruiserweight division to compete in the fourth season of the boxing reality show, The Contender.

Hoye defeated Mike Alexander and Joell Godfrey by decision in separate five round bouts. In the semifinal, Hoye lost by unanimous decision to Ehinomen Ehikhamenor of Nigeria. In February 2009, Hoye defeated Akinyemi Laleye by 8 round unanimous decision to win third place in the televised competition.

Return from retirement
Hoye, who lived in Los Angeles and then Phoenix, Arizona, with his wife and children, operated a boxing and fitness gym in Phoenix during his four years of inactivity, working with clients on physical conditioning, including training such professional athletes as baseball player Troy O'Leary and football running back Marcel Shipp. Hoye has also sparred with heavyweights Wladimir Klitschko and Chris Arreola.

Hoye returned to the ring on November 2, 2013, at heavyweight with a 1st-round TKO of Brandon Winner and then lost by unanimous decision to cruiserweight contender Lucasz Janik in Poland June 28, 2014.

Professional boxing record

|-
|align="center" colspan=8|24 Wins (16 knockouts, 8 decisions), 4 Losses (2 knockouts, 2 decisions) 
|-
| align="center" style="border-style: none none solid solid; background: #e3e3e3"|Result
| align="center" style="border-style: none none solid solid; background: #e3e3e3"|Record
| align="center" style="border-style: none none solid solid; background: #e3e3e3"|Opponent
| align="center" style="border-style: none none solid solid; background: #e3e3e3"|Type
| align="center" style="border-style: none none solid solid; background: #e3e3e3"|Round
| align="center" style="border-style: none none solid solid; background: #e3e3e3"|Date
| align="center" style="border-style: none none solid solid; background: #e3e3e3"|Location
| align="center" style="border-style: none none solid solid; background: #e3e3e3"|Notes
|-align=center
|Loss
|
|align=left| Łukasz Janik
|UD 
|10
|06/28/2014
|align=left| Hala na Podpromiu, Rzeszów, Poland
|align=left|
|-
|-align=center
|Win
|
|align=left| Brandon Winner
|TKO 
|1
|11/02/2013
|align=left| Potawatomi Bingo Casino, Milwaukee
|align=left|
|-
|-align=center
|Win
|
|align=left| Akinyemi Laleye
|UD
|8
|02/25/2009
|align=left| Foxwoods, Mashantucket, Connecticut
|align=left|
|-
|Loss
|
|align=left| Ehinomen Ehikhamenor
|UD
|5
|02/18/2009
|align=left|
|align=left|
|-
|Win
|
|align=left| Joell Godfrey
|UD
|5
|02/11/2009
|align=left|
|align=left|
|-
|Win
|
|align=left| Mike Alexander
|UD
|5
|01/12/2009
|align=left|
|align=left|
|-
|Loss
|
|align=left| Adrian Diaconu
|TKO
|3
|05/09/2007
|align=left| Studio Mel's, Montreal
|align=left|
|-
|Win
|
|align=left| Sam "Punching Policeman" Hill
|TKO
|10
|11/10/2006
|align=left| Quiet Cannon, Montebello, California
|align=left|
|-
|Win
|
|align=left| Derrick Whitley
|UD
|6
|12/10/2005
|align=left| Mohegan Sun, Uncasville, Connecticut
|align=left|
|-
|Loss
|
|align=left| Clinton Woods
|TKO
|5
|03/04/2005
|align=left| Magna Centre, Rotherham, Yorkshire
|align=left|
|-
|Win
|
|align=left| Montell Griffin
|SD
|12
|09/16/2004
|align=left| Kewadin Casino, Sault Sainte Marie, Michigan
|align=left|
|-
|Win
|
|align=left| Richard Hall
|KO
|4
|05/15/2004
|align=left| Mandalay Bay, Las Vegas
|align=left|
|-
|Win
|
|align=left| Donnell Wiggins
|TKO
|1
|03/18/2004
|align=left| Chumash Casino, Santa Ynez, California
|align=left|
|-
|Win
|
|align=left| Marris Virgil
|KO
|1
|12/12/2003
|align=left| Ford Community Center, Dearborn, Michigan
|align=left|
|-
|Win
|
|align=left| Etianne Whitaker
|TKO
|2
|10/11/2003
|align=left| The Palace of Auburn Hills, Auburn Hills, Michigan
|align=left|
|-
|Win
|
|align=left| Prince Badi Ajamu
|UD
|12
|06/05/2003
|align=left| State Theatre, Detroit
|align=left|
|-
|Win
|
|align=left| Tyrone Muex
|TKO
|3
|04/24/2003
|align=left| Grand Casino Gulfport, Gulfport, Mississippi
|align=left|
|-
|Win
|
|align=left| Segundo Mercado
|TKO
|1
|01/29/2003
|align=left| Andiamo's Banquet Center, Warren, Michigan
|align=left|
|-
|Win
|
|align=left| Ayodeji Fadeyi
|TKO
|1
|11/02/2002
|align=left| The Palace of Auburn Hills, Auburn Hills, Michigan
|align=left|
|-
|Win
|
|align=left| "Mr. Everything" Greg Wright
|UD
|8
|09/27/2002
|align=left| The Palace of Auburn Hills, Auburn Hills, Michigan
|align=left|
|-
|Win
|
|align=left| George Klinesmith
|TKO
|2
|06/08/2002
|align=left| Pyramid Arena, Memphis, Tennessee
|align=left|
|-
|Win
|
|align=left| Ruben Ruiz
|TKO
|2
|04/19/2002
|align=left| Auburn Hills, Michigan
|align=left|
|-
|Win
|
|align=left| Kenny Snow
|UD
|6
|01/31/2002
|align=left| The Roostertail, Detroit
|align=left|
|-
|Win
|
|align=left| Conley Person
|KO
|1
|01/22/2002
|align=left| Andiamo's Banquet Center, Detroit
|align=left|
|-
|Win
|
|align=left| Vidal Middlebrook
|TKO
|1
|12/21/2001
|align=left| Youngstown, Ohio
|align=left|
|-
|Win
|
|align=left| Marris Virgil
|KO
|2
|11/23/2001
|align=left| The Palace of Auburn Hills, Auburn Hills, Michigan
|align=left|
|-
|Win
|
|align=left| Percel Banks
|TKO
|3
|08/10/2001
|align=left| Cobo Hall, Detroit
|align=left|
|-
|Win
|
|align=left| Omar Pucci
|TKO
|3
|06/20/2001
|align=left| Andiamo's Banquet Center, Warren, Michigan
|align=left|
|}

References

1974 births
Living people
People from Monroe, Michigan
Boxers from Michigan
Light-heavyweight boxers
Cruiserweight boxers
The Contender (TV series) participants
American male boxers